The Casem Spinks Stadium is a 22,500-seat multi-purpose stadium in Lorman, Mississippi, which is the home field of the Alcorn State Braves college football team. The stadium is surrounded by the campus of Alcorn State University and is adjacent to the Davey Whitney Complex.

History
Opened in 1992, the stadium replaced Henderson Stadium. Its name is derived from former Alcorn State Braves football player Jack Spinks. The name was changed to the Marino Casem-Jack Spinks Memorial Stadium in 2011 after then Alcorn State president M. Christopher Brown II stated "Coach Casem helped Alcorn athletics increase both in stature and in reputation to become a nationally recognized university".

See also
 List of NCAA Division I FCS football stadiums

References

  

College football venues
Alcorn State Braves football
American football venues in Mississippi
Multi-purpose stadiums in the United States
Buildings and structures in Claiborne County, Mississippi
1992 establishments in Mississippi